NMA may refer to:
National Management Association, American association for teaching leadership in business management
National mapping agency, organisation that produces topographic maps and geographic information of a country
National Meat Association, a meat processors trade group, now part of the North American Meat Institute
National Medical Association, professional group for African-American physicians
National Mining Association, American trade organization for the mining industry
National Motorists Association, an American activist organization opposed to excessive traffic laws and enforcement
National Movie Awards, annual British film awards from 2007 to 2011
National Museum of Australia, museum in Acton, NCT, Australia
Nederlandse Mededingingsautoriteit (Netherlands Competition Authority), former Dutch regulatory agency
 Nepal Medical Association, medical doctor's association in Nepal
Nepal Mountaineering Association, the national mountaineering association of Nepal
Network management application, a program for management of a computer network
Neue Mozart-Ausgabe, second complete edition of the works of Mozart
New Media Age, British new media magazine
New Midsize Airplane, a Boeing project to develop a new airliner for delivery in the 2020s.
New Model Army (band), English rock band
News Media Alliance, a trade group for the news industry in the US and Canada 
Next Media Animation, former name of Next Animation Studio, Taiwanese company producing computer-animated political satire
Nigerian Medical Association, professional group for Nigerian doctors and dentists
Nollywood Movies Awards, annual film awards in Nigeria (since 2016, Nolly Awards)
Norwegian Maritime Authority, The Norwegian Maritime Authority is a government agency responsible for life, health, working conditions and the environment for Norwegian registered ships.
 Northern Mariana Islands, US territory.
 Namangan Airport IATA code
Native Mobile App, native mobile applications vs web applications
Enema